The 2014 Sports Lottery Cup Wuxi Classic was a professional ranking snooker tournament held between 23 and 29 June 2014 at the Wuxi City Sports Park Stadium in Wuxi, China. It was the first ranking event of the 2014/2015 season.

Neil Robertson defended his title, which he won in 2013, by defeating Joe Perry 10–9 in the final. This was Robertson's 10th ranking title.

Prize fund
The breakdown of prize money for this year is shown below:

Winner: £85,000
Runner-up: £35,000
Semi-final: £21,000
Quarter-final: £12,500
Last 16: £8,000
Last 32: £6,500
Last 64: £3,000

Televised highest break: £2,000
Total: £478,000

Wildcard round
These matches were played in Wuxi on 23 June 2014.

Main draw

Final

Qualifying
These matches were held between 24 and 28 May 2014 at The Capital Venue in Gloucester, England. All matches were best of 9 frames.

Century breaks

Qualifying stage centuries

 137  Neil Robertson
 136, 131  Michael Holt
 136  Chris Wakelin
 130  David Grace
 125, 105  Judd Trump
 120  David Morris
 117  Barry Pinches
 116  Yu Delu
 115  Alexander Ursenbacher
 111  Matthew Selt
 106  Joel Walker
 104  Kurt Maflin
 103  Michael White
 102  Dave Harold
 101  Anthony McGill
 101  Stuart Bingham

Televised stage centuries

 145, 118, 102  Stephen Maguire
 139, 134, 101  Robin Hull
 138  Barry Hawkins
 137  Joe Perry
 135  Ken Doherty
 130, 128, 105  Neil Robertson
 128, 111, 105, 100  Marco Fu
 128, 105, 101, 100  Liang Wenbo
 123, 119  Mark Selby
 122  Martin Gould
 122  John Higgins
 116  Judd Trump
 114  Michael Holt
 104  Rory McLeod

References

External links
 2014 Wuxi Classic – Pictures by Tai Chengzhe at Facebook

2014
2014 in snooker
2014 in Chinese sport